Turbot (Inis Toirbirt or Tairbeart in Irish) is a small island and a townland of County Galway, in Ireland, also referred as Inishturbot and Talbot Island.

Geography 

Turbot Island lies off the Irish coast not faraway from Clifden and Cleggan. It is located South of Inishturk and West of Aird Mhór Peninsula. The easiest place to land on Turbot is the North side of the island, where most of the old houses are gathered. A road cuts Turbot from East to West.

History 
A small community used to live on Turbot, but the island was evacuated in 1978. Later some of the old buildings were transformed into holiday homes.

Demographics 
The table below shows data on Inisturk's population taken from Discover the Islands of Ireland (Alex Ritsema, Collins Press, 1999) and the Census of Ireland.

See also
 List of islands of Ireland

References

Islands of County Galway
Townlands of County Galway
Uninhabited islands of Ireland